2005 Dutch Open may refer to:

 2005 Dutch Open (badminton)
 2005 Dutch Open (tennis)